Doug Goehring is the current North Dakota Agriculture Commissioner. A Republican, he was appointed to the office by Governor John Hoeven on April 6, 2009 to fill the vacancy created when Democratic-NPL incumbent Roger Johnson resigned to become president of the National Farmers Union.

Goehring had previously challenged Johnson in the 2004 and 2006 elections.

Electoral history

External links
North Dakota Department of Agriculture biography page

References

Living people
North Dakota Commissioners of Agriculture
North Dakota Republicans
Year of birth missing (living people)